The Paraná Association of Electrical Engineers (in Portuguese: Associação Paranaense de Engenheiros Eletricistas) exists to promote scientific and technological development and to protect the interests of professional electrical engineering, such as: electrical, electronics, telecommunications, computer, automation of the state of Paraná. It is a nonprofit organization.

It was founded on August 2, 1984 in Curitiba, capital of the Brazilian state of Paraná.

References

Electrical engineering organizations
Organisations based in Paraná (state)
Organizations established in 1984
1984 establishments in Brazil